Australian singer and songwriter Jessica Mauboy has recorded songs for a live album, three studio albums, non-album singles and an extended play, some of which were collaborations with other artists. After she became the runner-up on the fourth season of Australian Idol in 2006, Mauboy signed a contract with record label Sony Music Australia. The following year, she released her debut live album The Journey, which featured re-recorded covers of the selected songs she performed as part of the top twelve on Australian Idol. Mauboy's debut studio album Been Waiting was released in 2008. The lead single "Running Back", featuring Flo Rida, was written by Mauboy, Audius Mtawarira and Sean Ray Mullins. She also co-wrote the album's title track with Israel Cruz, while Jonas Jeberg and Mich "Cutfather" Hansen co-wrote the second single "Burn". Kwamé co-wrote and produced the fifth single "Up/Down". The sixth and final single "Let Me Be Me" was co-written by Sugababes member Jade Ewen. Been Waiting was re-released in 2009 and included several new songs written by Mauboy and Mtawarira, among others.

In 2010, Mauboy contributed guest vocals on the song "Love Me Tender" for Elvis Presley's soundtrack album, Viva Elvis. Her second studio album Get 'Em Girls was released in November 2010. In addition to working with Mtawarira and Cruz again, Mauboy collaborated with American songwriters and producers she had not worked with previously. The album's title track, featuring Snoop Dogg, was produced by Bangladesh, while the second single "Saturday Night" was co-written by Brian Kennedy and Ludacris, who also appears on the single as a featured artist. Cruz co-produced the third single "What Happened to Us", which features Jay Sean, while Harvey Mason, Jr. co-wrote the tracks "Fight for You" and "Here for Me". Get 'Em Girls was re-released in 2011 and featured the new single releases "Inescapable", which was written solely by Diane Warren, and "Galaxy".

Mauboy starred in the 2012 musical film The Sapphires and recorded fifteen songs for its accompanying soundtrack album. She co-wrote the soundtrack's lead single "Gotcha" with Ilan Kidron and Louis Schoorl. Mauboy also co-wrote ten of the thirteen songs on her third studio album Beautiful, which was released in 2013. She reunited with Kennedy on "Honest" and "Go (I Don't Need You)", while Pitbull co-wrote and appears as a featured artist on "Kick Up Your Heels". The album's fourth single "Never Be the Same" was written by Mauboy with Anthony Egizii and David Musumeci of the production team DNA. The Fliptones and The Underdogs also wrote and produced tracks for the album. Beautiful was re-released in 2014 and featured the new single releases "Can I Get a Moment?" and "The Day Before I Met You", both of which were co-written by Kenneth "Babyface" Edmonds. In July 2014, Mauboy released her first extended play iTunes Session, which contained a cover version of Frank Ocean's "Thinkin Bout You".

Note: Up to date as of 4 October 2020

Songs

See also
Jessica Mauboy discography

Notes

References

External links

Mauboy, Jessica